MITS may stand for:

Madhav Institute of Technology and Science (MITS Gwalior), a college in Madhya Pradesh, India
Micro Instrumentation and Telemetry Systems, an American electronics company known for the Altair 8800
Mody Institute of Technology and Science, now Mody University, a private women's university in Laxmangarh, India
Muncie Indiana Transit System, an American bus service
Museum Institute for Teaching Science, an American teacher training provider